Abatar (also Romanized as Abātar and Abāter) is a village in Taher Gurab Rural District, in the Central District of Sowme'eh Sara County, Gilan Province, Iran. At the 2006 census, its population was 1,822, in 528 families.

References 

Populated places in Sowme'eh Sara County